Russell Keith Hobby  (born 22 January 1972) is the CEO of Teach First. He was the General Secretary of the National Association of Head Teachers (NAHT) until September 2017.

Early life
He was born in Abingdon-on-Thames in Oxfordshire. His father, a plasma physicist for the United Kingdom Atomic Energy Authority. His mother was a qualified primary school teacher. He attended a comprehensive school, the John Mason School. He went to Corpus Christi College, Oxford to study PPE, leaving in 1993.

Career
He became General Secretary of NAHT in September 2010. He was re-elected General Secretary in January 2015. In May 2017, he was appointed CEO of Teach First.

Hobby was appointed Commander of the Order of the British Empire (CBE) in the 2022 New Year Honours for services to education.

Personal life

References

External links
 NAHT
 His blog

1972 births
Alumni of Corpus Christi College, Oxford
British trade union leaders
People from Abingdon-on-Thames
Living people
Commanders of the Order of the British Empire